David Butler (born October 31, 1966) is a retired American basketball player.  He won an NCAA championship as a senior at the University of Nevada, Las Vegas (UNLV) and played professionally in several countries, including a stint with Liga ACB in Spain.

Butler, a post player from Calvin Coolidge High School in Washington, D. C., attended San Jacinto Junior College where he was a National Junior College Athletic Association (NJCAA) All-American in 1988.  He was recruited to UNLV by coach Jerry Tarkanian and was a starter on the Rebels' 1990 NCAA championship team as a senior.  Butler scored 1,073 points (15.6 points per game) in his two-year Rebel career.

Following the completion of his college career, Butler was not selected in the 1990 NBA Draft.  He played professionally in Italy, Turkey, Spain, Cyprus, Puerto Rico and Greece.  He also had a stint with the Columbus Horizon of the Continental Basketball Association.

References

External links
Liga ACB database profile (Spanish)
TBLStat.net Profile

1966 births
Living people
Achilleas Kaimakli players
American expatriate basketball people in Cyprus
American expatriate basketball people in Greece
American expatriate basketball people in Italy
American expatriate basketball people in Spain
American men's basketball players
Basketball players from Washington, D.C.
CB Peñas Huesca players
Centers (basketball)
Columbus Horizon players
Galatasaray S.K. (men's basketball) players
Iraklis Thessaloniki B.C. players
Keravnos B.C. players
Liga ACB players
Oyak Renault basketball players
Power forwards (basketball)
San Jacinto Central Ravens men's basketball players
UNLV Runnin' Rebels basketball players